Evil Toons is a 1992 American live-action/adult animated comedy horror B-movie written and directed by Fred Olen Ray. The film is a light spoof of traditional haunted-house films.

Plot
In the past, Gideon Fisk hangs himself in the basement of a mansion, seemingly to spite a possessed book made of human skin. The film then moves to the present day where a quartet of co-eds are hired to clean the now old, decaying mansion over a weekend. Upon arrival, they clean the basement and find a strange dagger hidden in a chest. That night, the ghost of Gideon delivers the cursed book to their door. Once gone, the girls examine the book, finding it full of sketches of bizarre monsters engaged in depraved sex acts.

When an incantation in the book is read, one of the drawings emerges from the book and becomes a living cartoon. The cartoon mutt stalks and attacks the sexually liberated Roxanne, taking on her physical form after killing her. Roxanne's football player boyfriend arrives and is killed by the monster. The demon plans to damn the soul, of everyone in the house, to hell so they can bring back their other monster friends from the book prison. After finding Biff's body, the girls call their boss, Burt (Dick Miller). Burt arrives, but before he can help the girls he's lured away by Roxanne. She seduces then kills him. The monster goes on to kill two more girls, leaving only the sexually inexperienced, Megan, alive. 

The ghost of Gideon returns and aids Megan in defeating the monster, stabbing it with the strange dagger. Before the monster can return to the safety of the book, Megan, throws the book into the fireplace, incinerating it and erasing the monster from existence. Gideon explains that he needed Megan's corporeal strength to help him kill the demon and ascends to the afterlife. All of the monster's victims are revived the next morning, remembering only a bad dream. Mr. Hinchlow, a neighbor, stops by and brings his portable television set so that the girls can watch Saturday-morning cartoons, leaving Megan screaming in terror.

Cast
 David Carradine as Gideon Fisk
 Monique Gabrielle as Megan
 Madison Stone as Roxanne
 Stacey Nix as Jan
 Arte Johnson as Mr. Hinchlow
 Dick Miller as Burt
 Suzanne Ager as Terry
 Don Dowe as Biff
 Michelle Bauer as Burt's wife
 Fred Olen Ray as the voice of the monster

Production
The film was shot in eight days. Due to the low budget of the film, combined with the high cost of animation, the animated demon is only on screen for approximately 90 seconds in the film. Director Fred Olen Ray says that mainstream Hollywood executives would not finance the film, citing risk due to the premise. He was quoted saying "Even Roger Corman turned us down" and "He said it was too risky... so we did it ourselves."

Release
On May 4, 2010, Infinity Entertainment Group released the 20th Anniversary Edition on DVD.

Reception
The film has received a number of negative reviews. Rotten Tomatoes reports a score of 29% based on 7 reviews, with an average rating of 3.29/10. Critics were negative about the acting in the film, the dialogue, as well as the animation quality in addition to how sparsely it appears in the film.

The 2000 book horror movie encyclopedia Creature Feature gave the movie two out of 5 stars, stating that it was a sorry excuse for a movie, wasting the talents of Carradine and Miller.

References

External links
 
 
 
 

1990s comedy horror films
1992 LGBT-related films
1992 films
1992 horror films
1990s monster movies
American comedy horror films
American fantasy films
American films with live action and animation
American LGBT-related films
American satirical films
1990s English-language films
Erotic fantasy films
Films directed by Fred Olen Ray
American independent films
Lesbian-related films
LGBT-related comedy horror films
LGBT-related animated films
American sex comedy films
American monster movies
American sexploitation films
American supernatural horror films
Supernatural comedy films
Supernatural fantasy films
American erotic horror films
1990s American animated films
1990s sex comedy films
1991 comedy films
1991 films